Polyrhaphis belti is a species of beetle in the family Cerambycidae. It was described by Hovore and McCarty in 1998. It is known from Honduras, Costa Rica, Guatemala, Ecuador, Nicaragua, Colombia, and Panama.

References

Polyrhaphidini
Beetles described in 1998